Eduardo Fabián Ledesma Trinidad (born 7 August 1985) is a Paraguayan football midfielder.

Honours
Lanús
Argentine Primera División (1): 2007 Apertura

External links
 
 Argentine Primera statistics at Fútbol XXI 

1985 births
Living people
Paraguayan footballers
Association football midfielders
Club Olimpia footballers
Club Atlético Lanús footballers
Rosario Central footballers
Argentine Primera División players
Paraguayan expatriate footballers
Expatriate footballers in Argentina
Expatriate footballers in Ecuador
L.D.U. Quito footballers